Olszanka  is a village in Łosice County, Masovian Voivodeship, in east-central Poland. It is the seat of the gmina (administrative district) called Gmina Olszanka.

The village has a population of 375.

References

Villages in Łosice County
Siedlce Governorate
Kholm Governorate
Lublin Voivodeship (1919–1939)